Texas Terror is a 1935 American Monogram romantic Western film directed by Robert N. Bradbury and starring John Wayne, George "Gabby" Hayes and Lucile Brown.

Cast

 John Wayne as John Higgins
 Lucile Browne as Bess Matthews (billed as Lucille Browne)
 LeRoy Mason as Joe Dickson (billed as Leroy Mason)
 Fern Emmett as Aunt Martha Hubbard
 George "Gabby" Hayes as Sheriff Ed Williams (billed as George Hayes)
 Jay Wilsey as Blackie Martin (billed as Buffalo Bill Jr.)
 John Ince as blacksmith Bob
 Henry Roquemore as dance MC (billed as Henry Roguemore)
 Jack Duffy as Jake Abernathy

Reception
Texas Terror was released on February 1, 1935.

Reviewing the film as part of a collection, Stuart Galbraith called it part of a series of "substandard, ultra-cheap John Wayne pictures".  Reviewing another collection, Ike Oden of DVD Verdict called it a "disposable footnote".

See also
 John Wayne filmography
 List of American films of 1935

References

External links

 
 
 
 

1935 films
1935 Western (genre) films
1930s romance films
American Western (genre) films
American black-and-white films
American romance films
1930s English-language films
Films directed by Robert N. Bradbury
Monogram Pictures films
1930s American films